Wolverine is a fictional character appearing in American comic books published by Marvel Comics. He is one of the few X-Men characters to be included in every media adaptation of the X-Men franchise, including film, television, cartoons, podcasts, computer and video games, and is the only one to have starred in his own video games.

Television

1980s
Wolverine appears alongside the other X-Men in the Spider-Man and His Amazing Friends episode "A Firestar Is Born", voiced by William Callaway.
Wolverine appears in the 1989 animated television pilot X-Men: Pryde of the X-Men, voiced by Patrick Pinney.

1990s

Wolverine appears among the main cast of the X-Men animated TV series, voiced by Cathal J. Dodd. He frequently mocks Gambit, calling him "Cajun." Wolverine was also a close friend of Morph, feeling saddened by his supposed death. He often spends time by himself, but has a soft spot for Jubilee – the X-Men's rookie.
Wolverine appears in the Spider-Man episodes "Neogenic Nightmare Chapter 4: The Mutant Agenda" and "Neogenic Nightmare Chapter 5: Mutants Revenge", with Dodd reprising the role.

2000s

Wolverine appears in X-Men: Evolution, voiced by Scott McNeil. He provides the teenaged X-Men with battle training, but often creates conflict among his younger teammates.
Wolverine is featured in Wolverine and the X-Men, voiced by Steve Blum.
Wolverine appears in the fifth episode of the first season of Spider-Woman: Agent of S.W.O.R.D. motion comic. In this series, he is voiced by Jeffrey Hedquist.
Wolverine appears in the Astonishing X-Men motion comic, voiced by Marc Thompson and later by Brian Drummond.
Wolverine appears in The Super Hero Squad Show, voiced again by Steve Blum.
As part of a four-series collaboration between the Japanese Madhouse animation house and Marvel, Wolverine starred in a twelve-episode anime series named Marvel Anime: Wolverine, which premiered in Japan on Animax and in the United States on G4 in 2011. The series focuses on him going to Japan to investigate A.I.M. Steve Blum dubbed the role of Wolverine in the English version of Marvel Anime: X-Men. Logan also appears during the fourth episode of the Iron Man and the seventh episode of the Blade portion of the collaboration. He is voiced by Rikiya Koyama in the Japanese version and Milo Ventimiglia in the English dubbed version.

2010s
 Wolverine appears in the second episode of Black Panther, voiced by Kevin Michael Richardson. He, Cyclops, and Nightcrawler were with Storm when she was using Cerebro and finds out that Juggernaut is assisting in the attack on Wakanda.
 Wolverine appears in The Avengers: Earth's Mightiest Heroes, voiced again by Steve Blum. This version was a member of the Howling Commandos alongside Captain America and other heroes during World War II. He also appears in the episode "New Avengers" as part of the titular team, which was created by Tony Stark as a fail-safe in case the main Avengers would be unable to fight. He and the rest of the New Avengers appears again in the series' finale, "Avengers Assemble".
 Wolverine appears in the Wolverine: Origin motion comic, voiced by Alessandro Juliani.
 In Disney XD's Marvel Universe programs, Wolverine (voiced again by Steve Blum) is sporting his mainstream-version brown and yellow costume.
 He appears in four episodes of Ultimate Spider-Man.
 Wolverine makes a cameo appearance in the Hulk and the Agents of S.M.A.S.H.. He was seen in the episode "The Collector", as one of the heroes captured by the titular villain. Wolverine made a full appearance in the episode "Wendigo Apocalypse", when he teams up with the Hulk to hunt the Wendigo.
 Wolverine appears in the Ultimate Wolverine vs. Hulk motion comic, voiced by Brian Drummond.
 Wolverine appears in the anime series Marvel Disk Wars: The Avengers, voiced by Kenji Normura in Japanese and Steve Blum in English.
 Wolverine appears in the Wolverine versus Sabretooth motion comic, voiced by Brian Drummond.
 Wolverine appears in the Wolverine: Weapon X motion comic, voiced by Brian Drummond.

2020s 

 Wolverine is referenced in various easter eggs during the live-action Disney+ television series She-Hulk: Attorney at Law (2022), set in the Marvel Cinematic Universe (MCU). In the episode "Superhuman Law", a news article on a blog site browsed by Jennifer Walters alludes to a man spotted who fought in a bar brawl with metal claws. Additionally, the end-credits of the episode "Mean, Green, and Straight Poured into These Jeans" depicts a graphic of Augustus Pugliese showing off his sneaker collection to Nikki Ramos, a pair of which are directly inspired by the color scheme of Wolverine's classic costume.
 The incarnation of the character from the 1992 animated series will return in its upcoming 2023 revival for Disney+, with Cathal J. Dodd reprising his role.

Films

Animation
 Wolverine appears in the animated 4D film Marvel Super Heroes 4D.
 Steve Blum reprised his role as Wolverine in the film Hulk Vs., in a segment called "Hulk Vs. Wolverine". It also features many insights on Wolverine's past. This was tied in with the Wolverine and the X-Men series in the seventh episode, titled "Wolverine vs. Hulk", though the ties are loose, as there is very little (if any) continuity between this movie and the episode.
 Wolverine is featured in the 2013 Lego film Lego Marvel Super Heroes: Maximum Overload, voiced once again by Steve Blum.

Live-action

Logan as portrayed by Hugh Jackman has been a central figure of the 20th Century Fox X-Men film series, appearing in ten films (2000–2018). Jackman will return to play the character in the upcoming Deadpool 3 (2024), produced by Marvel Studios and set in the Marvel Cinematic Universe (MCU).

Video games

Wolverine is a playable character (often the primary or default playable character) in all X-Men video games and many Marvel video games in general.

Solo games
Video games featuring Wolverine as the lead character are Wolverine (1991) for the Nintendo Entertainment System (NES), Wolverine: Adamantium Rage (1994) for the Super Nintendo Entertainment System and Sega Genesis, X-Men: Wolverine's Rage (2001) for the Game Boy Color, X2: Wolverine's Revenge (2003), voiced by Mark Hamill, for GameCube, Game Boy Advance, Mac, PC, PlayStation 2, Xbox, and X-Men Origins: Wolverine (2009), voiced by Hugh Jackman, for Nintendo DS, PC, PlayStation 2, PlayStation 3, PlayStation Portable, Wii, and Xbox 360. Another NES game titled Wolverine was in development in 1989, developed by Zippo Games for Rare but it was cancelled.

In September 2021, Insomniac Games announced at the PlayStation Showcase event that they were in early development for a standalone game, titled Marvel's Wolverine. It features a standalone narrative set within the same continuity as the studios Spider-Man games. It will be released for the PlayStation 5.

Wolverine appears as a character in the following X-Men games:

Playable
The Uncanny X-Men (1989)
X-Men: Madness in Murderworld (1989)
X-Men II: The Fall of the Mutants (1990)
X-Men (1992)
Spider-Man and the X-Men in Arcade's Revenge (1992)
X-Men (1993)
X-Men (1994)
X-Men: Mutant Apocalypse (1994)
X-Men: Children of the Atom (1994)
X-Men: Gamesmaster's Legacy (1995)
X-Men 2: Clone Wars (1995)
X-Men vs. Street Fighter (1996)
X-Men: Mojo World (1996)
X-Men: The Ravages of Apocalypse (1997)
X-Men: Mutant Academy (2000) – voiced by Cathal J. Dodd, likeness of Hugh Jackman
X-Men: Mutant Wars (2000)
X-Men: Mutant Academy 2 (2001) – voiced by Tony Daniels
X-Men: Reign of Apocalypse (2001)
X-Men: Next Dimension (2002)
X2: Wolverine's Revenge (2003) – likeness of Hugh Jackman
X-Men Legends (2004) – voiced by Steve Blum
X-Men Legends II: Rise of Apocalypse (2005) – voiced by Steve Blum
X-Men: The Official Game (2006) – voiced by Hugh Jackman
X-Men Origins: Wolverine (2009) – voiced by Hugh Jackman
Uncanny X-Men: The Days of Future Past (2014)

Not playable
X-Men: Destiny (2011)
Deadpool (2013)

Spider-Man related games
 Wolverine also appears in several Spider-Man related games, beginning with 1992's Spider-Man/X-Men: Arcade's Revenge, and followed by a cameo in The Amazing Spider-Man 2 for the Game Boy and as a poster on a wall in the 2000 Spider-Man video game.
 The Ultimate Marvel version of Wolverine appears as a boss in the Ultimate Spider-Man video game, voiced by Keith Szarabajka. He is fought inside a pub while playing as Venom, after throwing his motorcycle through the wall of the pub, causing Wolverine to attack Venom in retaliation. However, Venom proves stronger and defeats Wolverine, knocking him unconscious.
 Wolverine appears as both an ally and a boss in Spider-Man: Web of Shadows, voiced by Steve Blum. He first appears shortly before the symbiote invasion that will consume Manhattan, ambushing Spider-Man at Hell's Kitchen, as he can smell symbiotes and believes him to be one. The two engage in a brief battle, during which he asks Spider-Man several questions to determine if Spider-Man is a symbiote or not. Regardless of the player giving wrong answers, Wolverine eventually trusts Spider-Man and the two settle their differences. Afterwards, they begin briefly working together to track down and defeat several hidden symbiotes, and Wolverine becomes an ally that the player can summon at any time during gameplay to help them fight enemies. Later, during the symbiote invasion, Wolverine helps Spider-Man evacuate a church full of civilians. After the evacuation is complete, Wolverine is attacked by two burly Symbiotes, which dog pile him to the ground and, thus, turn into a monstrous symbiote version of himself, fueled by rage. Symbiote Wolverine then battles Spider-Man, even using some symbiote pods to gain a temporary armor, but is ultimately defeated by the web-slinger. Depending on the player's choice, Spider-Man can either let Wolverine remove the symbiote himself by using his claws to gut himself, or remove the symbiote by force and then rip Wolverine in half (ironically, Wolverine has suggested doing this to Spider-Man earlier, if he ever became infected by a symbiote); the latter choice will cause Wolverine to angrily swear to kill Spider-Man, thus making Wolverine unavailable as an ally for the rest of the game. If the player chooses to activate the device meant to destroy all the symbiotes and stop the invasion, Wolverine is seen in the final mission of the game, fighting the symbiotes aboard the S.H.I.E.L.D. Helicarrier alongside the other hero allies, while Spider-Man plants bombs to destroy the Helicarrier and stop Venom for good. In both evil endings (if the player chose to destroy the device), after Spider-Man takes over the symbiote army and rules over Manhattan, Black Widow enlists a symbiote infected Wolverine, who this time is in full control of his symbiote, to hunt Spider-Man down and bring him to her dead or alive, with Symbiote Wolverine opting for the former option. 
In the PlayStation 2 and PSP versions of the game, Wolverine is an assist character who will slash enemies with his claws.
 The Ultimate Marvel version of Wolverine is referenced in Spider-Man: Shattered Dimensions. He is mentioned in Deadpool's level in the Ultimate dimension, where Deadpool briefly refers to the time he and Spider-Man switched brains. Wolverine also makes a cameo appearance in the Hobgoblin level in the 2099 dimension as a visual display, seemingly borrowing the design from Hulk Vs.

Other Marvel related games
Wolverine is a playable character in the fighting games Marvel Super Heroes, Marvel Super Heroes In War of the Gems (as both a playable character and a cloned enemy foot soldier), Marvel Super Heroes vs. Street Fighter, Marvel vs. Capcom: Clash of Super Heroes, Marvel vs. Capcom 2: New Age of Heroes (in two different versions: one with adamantium claws and the other with longer bone claws), Marvel Nemesis: Rise of the Imperfects, Marvel vs. Capcom 3: Fate of Two Worlds, Ultimate Marvel vs. Capcom 3, and Marvel Contest of Champions. He is voiced by Cathal J. Dodd in these games with the notable exception of Marvel vs. Capcom 3, in which Steve Blum reprises his role, and Marvel Nemesis: Rise of the Imperfects, where he is voiced by David Kaye.
 Wolverine appears as one of the four main playable characters alongside Captain America, Thor and Spider-Man  in Marvel: Ultimate Alliance, voiced by Steve Blum. His Modern costume (simply a torn-up T-shirt and jeans), Classic costume (John Byrne's tan and brown design), Astonishing costume (John Cassaday's variation of the classic yellow and blue costume), and Ultimate Marvel costumes are available. He has special dialogue with Jean Grey, Deathbird, Dum Dum Dugan, The Vision, Black Widow and Nick Fury. A simulation disk has Wolverine fighting Warstar on the Omega Base and another simulation disk has Ghost Rider defending him from Baron Mordo.
 Wolverine appears as an initially playable character in Marvel: Ultimate Alliance 2, voiced again by Steve Blum. He alongside Spider-Man, Captain America, Iron Man and Nick Fury, attack Latveria at the beginning of the story. His Secret War attire features as his alternate costume. When the Civil War begins, Wolverine like Spider-Man is playab on both sides.
 Wolverine was a playable character in Marvel Avengers Alliance.
 Wolverine appears as a playable character in Marvel Avengers: Battle for Earth, voiced again by Steve Blum.
 Wolverine is a playable character in Marvel Heroes, with Steve Blum reprising the role.
 Wolverine appears in Deadpool, voiced again by Steve Blum. His most prominent role is in a minor bonus feature in the "Genosha" level in which Deadpool repeatedly slaps the unconscious Wolverine while yelling nonsensical insults in an attempt to wake him up. He appears unaware that he is in a game, given his response to Deadpool stating that he was setting up a surprise for the player. Deadpool apparently calls constantly to ask if he can take the Blackbird out for a joyride.
 Wolverine is a playable character in Lego Marvel Super Heroes, with Steve Blum reprising the role.
 Wolverine is a playable character in Marvel: Avengers Alliance Tactics.
 Wolverine is a playable character in Marvel: Future Fight.
 Wolverine is a playable character in Marvel Strike Force.
 Wolverine is a playable character in Marvel Powers United VR, voiced again by Steve Blum.
 Wolverine is a playable character in Marvel Ultimate Alliance 3: The Black Order, voiced once again by Steve Blum.
 Wolverine appears in Marvel Realm of Champions.
 Wolverine is a playable character in Marvel's Midnight Suns, with Steve Blum reprising his role.

Super Hero Squad games
 Wolverine appears as a playable character in the Marvel Super Hero Squad video game and its sequel, with Steve Blum voicing the role.
 Wolverine appears as a playable character in the game Marvel Super Hero Squad: Comic Combat, again voiced by Steve Blum.
 Wolverine is a playable character in Marvel Super Hero Squad Online, and have five forms: his normal yellow and blue outfit, his classic yellow and brown outfit, an "Avenger" outfit, jeans and white T-shirt outfit and a samurai outfit with the Murasama blade. Steve Blum reprises his voice role.

Other games
 Wolverine is available as downloadable content for the game LittleBigPlanet, as part of "Marvel Costume Kit 3".
 Wolverine is an unlockable character skin in Activision's 2001 Tony Hawk's Pro Skater 3.
 Wolverine was added as an unlockable outfit in Fortnite Battle Royale Chapter 2, Season 4, as part of the "Nexus War" season update.

Novels
Wolverine appears in the X-Men/Star Trek crossover novel Planet X. In it, he befriends Worf, who has a similar appreciation of combat and fighting. Wolverine programs the holodeck of the Enterprise-E to simulate Sabretooth, the Blob, Unus the Untouchable, and Juggernaut for him and Worf to fight.

Podcasts
In 2017, Marvel Entertainment announced its first foray into podcasting with a new series centering around Wolverine, Wolverine: The Long Night. The series, produced by Stitcher is a detective story set in Alaska starring Richard Armitage as the amnesiac titular character as he gets involved in an investigation by two FBI agents on several murders. The creator of the show has said it would explore connections to Wolverine's past such as Weapon X, World War II-era Japan, and his past relationships. A 2018 follow up series, The Lost Trail, followed Wolverine, again voiced by Armitage, to Louisiana where mutants were being kidnapped.

In September 2021, a Spanish-language version of The Long Night podcast — Wolverine: La Larga Noche — starring Joaquín Cosío as Wolverine was released as part of Marvel's podcasting partnership with SiriusXM.

In 2021, Marvel New Media and Sirius XM announced Marvel's Wastelanders, a series of podcasts set in a version of the Old Man Logan universe. Marvel's Wastelanders: Wolverine launched in June 2022, featuring Robert Patrick as the voice of Wolverine. Patrick reprised the role in the final installment of Wastelanders.

Live performance
 Wolverine appears in the Marvel Universe: LIVE! arena show.

See also
X-Men in other media

References

External links